Anthony Hammond was a politician and writer.

Anthony Hammond may also refer to:

Anthony Hammond (legal writer) (1758–1838), English barrister and legal writer
Anthony Hammond (musician), English organist
Anthony Hammond (lawyer) (born 1940), British lawyer and public servant